Andrei Ivanovitch (born 1968 in Bucharest, Romania) is an international classical pianist and winner of a number of international competitions.

Biography and career 
Andrei Ivanovitch, great-grandson of the Romanian composer Ion Ivanovici (The Waves of the Danube), studied at the Central Music School, at the Leningrad Conservatory, at the Music Academy in Moscow and at the Musical College in Karlsruhe.
He won several prizes in international competitions, amongst others he won the gold medal at the World Piano Competition in Cincinnati, Ohio, U.S.
The specialised press compares him to Dinu Lipatti and Arturo Benedetti Michelangeli. Since 2003, he is honorary member of the Chopin Society.  His numerous concerts in Europe earned him the reputation of being one of the great Interpreters of Russian piano music.  The Canadian film Glenn Gould: The Russian Journey with Ivanovitch interpreting The Art of Fugue by Johann Sebastian Bach was awarded with the Grand at the International Festival  of Films on Art in Montreal. During his Germany tours he always gave guest performances at Hummer's Culture Parlour  in Soßmar (whose owner, Gerhard Hummer, he's been friends with for several years), which made him a great following in this region.
During his tour in 2007, he met the jazz pianist Eyran Katsenelenbogen in the Hummer's Culture Parlour  in Soßmar, in order to create a new kind of piano concert.

Press 
 Kulturring Peine
 Hummer's Culture Parlour, October 5th, 2007 (english)
 Peiner Allgemeine Zeitung, October 6th, 2007 (german)
 Peiner Allgemeine Zeitung, October 8th, 2007 (german)
 Peiner Allgemeine Zeitung, October 14th, 2007 (german)
 Calenberger Cultour & Co.
 Any comments by the international press

Discography 
 1999: various artists Best of Mozart CD (1 of 8 tracks)
 1999: various artists Best of Chopin - Grande Valse Brilliante, Barcarole, etc. CD (8 of 11 tracks)
 2000: Ivanovitch & De Luca Chopin: Piano Concertos
 2001: various artists Monet Collection - Romantic Moments CD (1 of 29 tracks)
 2002: various artists 50 Classical Performances - Romantic Piano CD (24 of 50 tracks)

References

External links 
 Andrei Ivanovitch official site
 Andrei Ivanovitch biography at official site

1968 births
Living people
Romanian classical pianists
Musicians from Bucharest
Romanian people of Serbian descent
Hochschule für Musik Karlsruhe alumni
21st-century classical pianists